Amyntas I was king of the ancient Greek kingdom of Macedonia and a vassal of Darius I from 512/11 until his death in 497 BC. He was a member of the Argead dynasty and son of Alcetas. His spouse is unknown, but his son was Alexander I.

Amyntas was a vassal of Darius I, king of the Achaemenid Empire, from 512/511 BC. Amyntas gave the present of "Earth and Water" to Megabazus, which symbolized submission to the Achaemenid Emperor. One of the daughters of Amyntas, Gygaea, was married to the Persian general Bubares in order to reinforce the alliance.

The history of Macedonia may be said to begin with Amyntas' reign. He was the first of its rulers to have diplomatic relations with other states. In particular, he entered into an alliance with Hippias of Athens, and when Hippias was driven out of Athens he offered him the territory of Anthemus on the Thermaic Gulf with the object of taking advantage of the feuds between the Greeks.  Hippias refused the offer and also rejected the offer of Iolcos, as Amyntas probably did not control Anthemous at that time, but was merely suggesting a plan of joint occupation to Hippias.

References

Notes

Citations

Attribution

Sources
Herodotus v. 17, 94
Justin vii. 2
Thucydides ii. 100
Pausanias ix. 40

6th-century BC births
498 BC deaths
6th-century BC Macedonian monarchs
5th-century BC Macedonian monarchs
Argead kings of Macedonia
5th-century BC rulers
6th-century BC rulers
Achaemenid Macedon
Rulers in the Achaemenid Empire
Iolcus